Vanderlei is a given name popular in Brazil as well as a surname. The given name derives from the surname, which derives from the Dutch van der Lee. The Brazilian family name Vanderlei and Wanderley, now also used as given names, was introduced in Brazil in 1637 by the Dutch cavalry captain Gaspar/Caspar van Niehof van der Leij, who may have been born in Gummersbach.  
Notable people with the name include:

Given name

Vanderlei José Alves or simply Vanderlei (born 1978), Brazilian football striker
Rubens Vanderlei Tavares Cardoso (born 1976), Brazilian retired left wingback, current assistant manager of Brasil de Pelotas
Vanderlei Francisco, Brazilian footballer
Vanderlei de Lima (born 1969), former long-distance runner who specialised in marathons
Vanderlei Luxemburgo (born 1952), Brazilian football manager and former player
Jean Raphael Vanderlei Moreira (born 1986), simply known as Jean, is a Brazilian footballer
Palhinha (Vanderlei Eustaquio de Oliveira) (born 1950), retired Brazilian footballer
Vanderlei Alves de Oliveira (born 1959), former Brazilian football (soccer) player
Vanderlei Bernardo Oliveira, centre forward and attacking midfielder
Vanderlei Silva de Oliveira (born 1977), former Brazilian football player
Vanderlei Paiva (born 1946), Brazilian professional football coach and former player
Vanderlei Mascarenhas dos Santos (born 1982), Brazilian footballer
Vanderlei Farias da Silva (born 1984), Brazilian footballer
Vanderlei Fernandes Silva (born 1975), Brazilian former footballer
Rizoneide Vanderlei (born 1966), former Brazilian long-distance runner

Surname

 João Maurício Vanderlei, Baron of Cotegipe (1815–1889), magistrate and Brazilian politician of the Conservative Party

See also
 Wanderlei, a spelling variant of the name
 Wanderley, a spelling variant of the name

References

Brazilian given names